Eucosma pupillana is a species of moth of the family Tortricidae.

Description
The wingspan is 14–19 mm. This moth has a characteristic wing pattern, with a whitish ground colour, pale brown fasciate markings on the forewings and well-developed black ocelli. Adults have been recorded on wing from July to August in Europe.

The larvae feed on Artemisia absinthium. They feed inside the stems and roots of their host plant.

Distribution
This species can be found in Great Britain, Spain, France, Belgium, the Netherlands, Germany, Denmark, Austria, Switzerland, Italy included Sicily, the Czech Republic, Slovakia, Slovenia, Hungary, Bulgaria, Romania, Poland, Norway, Sweden, Finland, the Baltic region, Russia (Ural Mountains), Asia Minor, Iran, Kazakhstan, Tajikistan, Kyrgyzstan and China (Heilongjiang, Shaanxi, Qinghai, Xinjiang).

References

Moths described in 1759
Eucosmini
Taxa named by Carl Alexander Clerck